Hillary Gilbert "Minnie" Menard (born January 15, 1934) is a Canadian retired  professional ice hockey left winger who played in one National Hockey League game for the Chicago Black Hawks during the 1953–54 season. The rest of his career, which lasted from 1954 to 1968, was spent in various minor leagues. Hillary is the brother of Howie Menard.

Playing career
Leaving home at the age of fifteen, Minnie crafted one of the great stories in Canadian and USA hockey's Golden Age. At 5' 10" and weighing 178 lbs, his professional hockey career spanned fourteen years across six different leagues. Minnie's playing career ended in 1968.

Career statistics

Regular season and playoffs

See also
 List of players who played only one game in the NHL

External links
 

1934 births
Living people
Barrie Flyers players
Canadian expatriate ice hockey players in the United States
Canadian ice hockey left wingers
Chicago Blackhawks players
Des Moines Oak Leafs players
Galt Black Hawks players
Hamilton Tiger Cubs players
Ice hockey people from Ontario
New York Rovers players
Omaha Knights (IHL) players
Ontario Hockey Association Senior A League (1890–1979) players
Sportspeople from Timmins